Paul Simon 1964/1993 is a compilation album released in 1993 by Paul Simon. It contains a collection of recordings ranging from his earliest collaboration with Art Garfunkel (the 1957 release "Hey, Schoolgirl") and further Simon & Garfunkel hits to songs from his subsequent solo career. Despite carrying the title Paul Simon 1964/1993, the music on this compilation was recorded between 1957 and 1993.

The three-disc box-set was designed and edited by Simon himself and includes only three previously unreleased tracks: "Thelma" (which was left off The Rhythm of the Saints); the original demo version of "Bridge over Troubled Water"; and a live rendition of "Still Crazy After All These Years". Noteworthy omissions from the compilation are "Homeward Bound" and "I Am a Rock".

Track listing

Disc 1

"Leaves That Are Green" (2:29)
"The Sound of Silence" (3:03)
"Kathy's Song" (Live) (3:22)
"America" (3:23)
"Cecilia" (2:52)
"El Condor Pasa (If I Could) (3:05)
"The Boxer" (5:08)
"Mrs. Robinson" (3:52)
"Bridge over Troubled Water" (Demo version) (2:33)
"Bridge over Troubled Water" (4:56)
"The Breakup" (2:15)
"Hey, Schoolgirl" (2:14)
"My Little Town" (3:49)
"Me and Julio Down by the Schoolyard" (2:44)
"Peace Like a River" (3:16)
"Mother and Child Reunion" (3:05)
"Congratulations" (3:42)
"Duncan" (Live) (5:04)
"American Tune" (3:45)

Disc 2

"Loves Me Like a Rock" (3:19)
"Tenderness" (2:52)
"Kodachrome" (3:29)
"Gone at Last" (3:28)
"Take Me to the Mardi Gras" (3:21)
"St. Judy's Comet" (3:18)
"Something So Right" (4:28)
"Still Crazy After All These Years" (Live) (3:49)
"Have a Good Time" (3:23)
"Jonah" (3:18)
"How the Heart Approaches What It Yearns" (2:47)
"50 Ways to Leave Your Lover" (3:06)
"Slip Slidin' Away" (4:43)
"Late in the Evening" (3:54)
"Hearts and Bones" (5:38)
"Rene And Georgette Magritte with Their Dog after the War" (3:42)
"The Late Great Johnny Ace" (4:45)

Disc 3

"The Boy in the Bubble" (3:58)
"Graceland" (4:48)
"Under African Skies" (3:36)
"That Was Your Mother" (2:52)
"Diamonds on the Soles of Her Shoes" (5:47)
"You Can Call Me Al" (4:40)
"Homeless" (3:47)
"Spirit Voices" (3:55)
"The Obvious Child" (4:09)
"Can't Run But" (3:34)
"Thelma" (4:11)
"Further to Fly" (5:32)
"She Moves On" (4:56)
"Born at the Right Time" (Live) (5:08)
"The Cool, Cool River" (Live) (5:44)
"The Sound of Silence" (Live) (5:39)

Certifications

References

Paul Simon compilation albums
1993 compilation albums
Warner Records compilation albums
Albums produced by Paul Simon
Albums produced by Art Garfunkel
Albums produced by Roy Halee
Albums produced by Phil Ramone